Frederick Yuengling (January 26, 1848 – January 2, 1899) was an American businessman and the second president and owner of America's oldest brewery, D. G. Yuengling & Son.

Personal life
Frederick Yuengling was born to David Yuengling and wife Elizabeth (née Betz) on January 26, 1848. He attended Pennsylvania State College and then the Manhattan Business School in Poughkeepsie, New York. In 1871, his father sent him to Europe to learn more about brewing, where he studied in Munich, Stuttgart and Vienna.

Yuengling married his wife, Minna Dohrman of Brooklynn, on April 3, 1873. Minna was from the "uppermost social class" in New York and enjoyed the mannered social scene in Pennsylvania. The newlyweds purchased a townhouse on Mahantongo Street, a street known for its "opulence" at the time. The house had six bedrooms, formal living rooms, formal dining rooms, a music room, tiled entryways, a Spanish crystal chandelier and German stained-glass windows.

On one occasion, Yuengling took a group of friends to Europe on a grand tour and then back to New York City without allowing them "to spend a cent". On the top floor of the Yuengling brewery there was a famous room where Yuengling entertained his friends on a lavish scale.

Yuengling and his wife had two children. Frank D. Yuengling was born September 27, 1876. Daughter Edith Louise Yuengling followed on March 18, 1878. Louise died on October 6, 1883, at 5 years old. This left son Frank as the sole heir of his parents.

On January 3, 1899, the New York Times announced that Yuengling had died of pneumonia the day previously. Yuengling was almost aged 51 at the time of his death. The New York Times had routinely covered Yuengling during his life.

Business

In 1873, Yuengling joined his father at the brewery, where the business name was changed from D.G. Yuengling to D.G. Yuengling & Son.

Yuengling was vice president of the Schuylkill Electric Railway Company, which started 1889.

Yuengling also served as the president of the Pottsville Gas Company, a position that his father had held as well. He was also director of the Pottsville Water Company and of the safety deposit box, both positions that had previously belonged to his father.

References

American brewers
American people of German descent
People from Pottsville, Pennsylvania
German-American culture in Pennsylvania
1848 births
1899 deaths
Deaths from pneumonia in New York (state)
Yuengling family
19th-century American businesspeople